Nicholas Byrne may refer to:

 Nicky Byrne, born 1978, Irish pop singer
 Nicholas Byrne, died circa 1833, proprietor of The Morning Post and father of William Pitt Byrne

See also
Nicholas Burne, 16th century Scottish controversialist
Nicholas Burns (disambiguation)